Darci Vetter is an American government official and academic who served as Chief Agricultural Negotiator for the Office of the United States Trade Representative.

Early life and education 
Vetter grew up in Nebraska on a family farm run by her father David Vetter Vetter received a B.A. from Drake University and an M.P.A. from the Woodrow Wilson School of Public and International Affairs at Princeton University.

Career 
From 2007 to 2010, she was an International Trade Advisor on the United States Senate Committee on Finance. Prior to working in the Senate, Vetter held numerous roles at the Office of the United States Trade Representative, including Director for Agricultural Affairs from 2005 to 2007 and Director for Sustainable Development from 2001 to 2005. Prior to that, she was Special Assistant to the Under Secretary of State for Management from 2000 to 2001. Vetter then served as Deputy Under Secretary of Agriculture for Farm and Foreign Agricultural Services from 2010 to 2014.

On December 17, 2013, President Barack Obama nominated her to be Chief Agricultural Negotiator, and the Senate confirmed her for that position by a voice vote on July 9, 2014.

In July 2017, she was named diplomat in residence at the University of Nebraska–Lincoln. In this role, Vetter worked with leaders from the university's College of Law, College of Business and Institute of Agriculture and Natural Resources to launch the Clayton K. Yeutter Institute of International Trade and Finance.

References

United States Department of Agriculture officials
Living people
Year of birth missing (living people)